Chandrasiri Gajadeera (26 February 1946 – 6 September 2019)  was a Sri Lankan politician, a member of the Parliament of Sri Lanka and Minister of Rehabilitation and Prisons.

References

1946 births
2019 deaths
Members of the 10th Parliament of Sri Lanka
Members of the 11th Parliament of Sri Lanka
Members of the 13th Parliament of Sri Lanka
Members of the 14th Parliament of Sri Lanka
Members of the 15th Parliament of Sri Lanka
Government ministers of Sri Lanka
Sri Lankan communists
Communist Party of Sri Lanka politicians
United People's Freedom Alliance politicians